Francis Kempe (by 1534 – 1597 or later), of London and Yedding, Middlesex, was an English politician.

He was a Member (MP) of the Parliament of England for Lincoln in 1558 and Ripon in 1559.

References

Year of death missing
People from Lincoln, England
English MPs 1558
English MPs 1559
Year of birth uncertain